Aattral is a 2022 Indian Tamil-language film directed by K. L. Kannan and starring Vidharth, Shrita Rao and Vamsi Krishna. It was released on 14 October 2022.

Plot

Cast
Vidharth as Arjun
Shrita Rao
Vamsi Krishna
Charle
Vicky
Vidyullekha Raman

Reception
The film was released on 14 October 2022 across Tamil Nadu. A critic from Maalai Malar gave the film a positive review, noting that "caution was necessary". A reviewer from Dinamalar gave the film a positive  review, criticising the quality of the final product. A reviewer from Cinema Express noted "Vidaarth’s latest outing is a far cry from its ambitions and gives the impression of being a pitch for a grander, smarter thriller".

References

External links

2022 films
2020s Tamil-language films